Zovreti is a village in the Imereti region of Georgia.

References
 Georgian Soviet Encyclopedia Vol. 4, p. 525, 1979.

Geography of Georgia (country)
Populated places in Zestafoni Municipality